Posing as People (2005) is a collection of three short stories by Orson Scott Card plus three plays by three different playwrights based on those stories.

Contents
"Clap Hands and Sing" - short story by Orson Scott Card
"Clap Hands and Sing" - play by Scott Brick
"Lifeloop" - short story by Orson Scott Card
"Lifeloop" - play by Aaron Johnson
"A Sepulchre of Songs" - short story by Orson Scott Card
"A Sepulchre of Songs" - play by Emily Janice Card (Card's daughter)

See also
List of works by Orson Scott Card
Orson Scott Card

External links
 The official Orson Scott Card website

Books by Orson Scott Card